Colleen Lunsford Bevis (1916–2013) was a prominent children's advocate in Hillsborough County, Florida, USA. She was active for six decades and instrumental in founding the Children's Board of Hillsboough County. She became Florida state president of the Parent Teachers Association.

Biography 

Colleen Lunsford was born on September 5, 1916 to J.J. and Geraldine Lunsford, one of eight brothers and sisters. A Hillsborough County native, Colleen attended E. Lee Elementary School, graduated from Brandon High School, and went on to attend the University of Tampa. Upon graduation, she went on to marry H. Wayne Bevis, who became an executive for Eastern Airlines of Tampa. Colleen and H. Wayne Bevis were married for a total of 52 years before his death. Colleen and her husband have three daughters, Dorothy Ann Ward, Beverly Bevis, and Judith Bevis Langevin. Colleen was step-mother to Dorothy Ann Ward, who preceded her in death.

Colleen Lunsford Bevis spent over sixty years dedicated to children's advocacy. In memory of Colleen, Hillsborough County Public Schools writes, "From the early days of the fifties to today, Mrs. Bevis has been tireless, consistently working long hours every week voluntarily advocating, organizing, patiently informing, inspiring, and when necessary, cajoling those able to help children". Colleen joined the local PTA in 1951, where she later became a local president. This was her initial step towards a long career of child advocacy. One of her most notable accomplishments was her role in the creation of the Hillsborough County Children's Board, which she organized alongside of Hillsborough County Commissioner, Jan Platt. According to Hillsborough County Schools, Colleen volunteered with the following organizations:

 PTA since 1951, Local President, 1955-1957
 County Council President, 1958-1960
 State President, 1968-1970
 National PTA Board, 1970-1974
 State Committee on new Constitution, 1968
 Hillsborough County Charter Commission, 1970
 Charter member and first President, Board of Junior Museum, 1967-1967
 Hillsborough County Needs Assessment, 1989-1991, Vice-Chair
 District Mental Health Board, 1971-1984, President, 1973-1974
 District Planning Council, Alcohol, Drug Abuse and Mental Health, 1984-1989
 State Mental Health Association Task Force on Children 1982-1983
 Children's Committee, District III Department of Children and Families: 1971–present
 National Advisory Board, Research & Training Center for Children's Mental Health, 1984-1991
 Florida Public School Board, 1969-1970
 Board of Trustees, Hillsborough Community College, 1978-1982;Chair, 1981-1982
 State Advisory Board, Network for Severely Emotionally Disturbed Children, 1982-1989; Chair, 1984-1991
 Hillsborough County Department of Children's Services, Board of Advisers, 1974-1989; Chair, 1984-1991
 Hillsborough County Study Commission on Children and Youth, 1977-1980;Chair
 Child Abuse Council, Board of Directors, 1984-1986
 Governor's Constituency for Children, 1984-1987
 Juvenile Justice and Delinquency Prevention, State Advisory Group, 1985-1987
 Hillsborough Constituency for Children, 1984-1991, Chair, 1984-1986
 Children's Board Community Advisory Committee, 1989-1991, Chair, 1990-1991
 Citizen's Board for Hillsborough County Children's Board, 1988
 Children's Board of Hillsborough County, 1992–present (Governor's Appointment)
 District VI Department of Children and Families Health and Human Services Board, 1992–present (Governor's Appointment)

Awards 

Colleen Lunsford Bevis has won numerous awards for child advocacy efforts. Hillsborough County Schools notes her awards received as follows:

 Service to Mankind award, Tampa Downtown and Central Florida Sertoma Club, 1977
 Northside Residential Unit for Emotionally disturbed Children dedicated to Colleen Lunsford, 1981
 Eliza Woolf Award for Service to the Community, Tampa United Methodist Centers, 1981
 Hillsborough Board of County Commissioners named the Children's Services Office the Colleen Lunsford Bevis Administration Building, 1986
 Public Citizen of the Year, Tampa Bay Unit of the National Association of Social Workers, 1982
 Florida JC Penney Golden Rule Award for volunteerism, 1985
 Award for Leadership, Hillsborough Constituency for Children, 1985
 People of Dedication Award, Salvation Army Women's Auxiliary, 1988
 Child Advocate of the Year, Gulf Coast Division, Children's Home Society of Florida, 1989
 University of South Florida, President's Distinguished Citizen's Award, 1990
 National Child Labor Committee, Lewis Hine Award, 1993 (presented by Hillary Clinton)

Legacy 

In regards to Colleen Lunsford Bevis' many achievements, her legacy will be long lasting. The children's welfare system will forever be changed for the better, and her accomplishments will forever be felt. In addition, many dedications have been made in her honor. In 2000, the Hillsborough County School Board named an elementary school in her honor, the Colleen Bevis Elementary School. The school is located in Lithia, Florida and is home to the Bevis Broncos. According to the Hillsborough County Public School System, "In 1987, the cooperative school program for severely emotionally disturbed students at USF's Department of Child and Family Studies was officially named the Colleen Lunsford Bevis School by both USF and Hillsborough County School Board in recognition of her work". Located on the same campus at that time, the Colleen Bevis Resource and Education Center held systems of care resources for children and families. According to the Florida Mental Health Institute, the resource center was also a place for, "...public interest , non-profit civic and support groups to hold meetings and conduct organizational activities." Unfortunately, both the Colleen Lunsford Bevis School and Resource Center located on the USF campus has closed, but her legacy still remains. Recently, the Children's Board dedicated a board room in Colleen's honor as well

Colleen Lunsford Bevis died on October 11, 2013, at her home in Hillsborough County, Florida.

Bevis's personal collection of papers, clippings, correspondence, and resources are held by the Louis de la Parte Florida Mental Health Institute Research Library. According to the library, the collection "consists of documents and other materials detailing Bevis’ work as an advocate for the mental and social health and well-being of children in Hillsborough County, Florida. The bulk of the archive reflects Bevis’ professional service and commitment to child welfare, with particular emphasis on the development of such local and statewide organizations as the Hillsborough County Children’s Board, SEDNET and the Colleen Bevis School at the Florida Mental Health Institute ...Researchers may be interested in the collection’s usefulness for chronicling the evolution of child welfare services in Hillsborough County as related to mental and emotional health".

References 

1916 births
2013 deaths
People from Hillsborough County, Florida
University of Tampa alumni
Eastern Air Lines